Public Sex (Original title: Dogging: A Love Story) is a British romantic comedy film released in 2009 starring Luke Treadaway, Kate Heppell, Justine Glenton and Richard Riddell, directed by Simon Ellis and written by Michael Groom and Brock Norman Brock. The film was originally titled Dogging: A Love Story, and was changed to Public Sex when released in the United States.

Premise
Dan (Luke Treadaway) is an aspiring journalist who drops his inhibitions to research the United Kingdom's underground subculture of dogging or public sex and along the way finds love and friendship.

Cast
 Luke Treadaway as Dan
 Kate Heppell as Laura
 Richard Riddell as Rob
 Sammy T. Dobson as Tanya
 Michael Socha as Jim
 Justine Francesca Glenton as Sarah (as Justine Glenton)
 Allen Mechen as Laura's Dad
 Malcolm Freeman as Mister Dole
 Sean Francis as Winston
 Shaun Mechen as Interested Piker
 Dirk Smith as	Council Dogger
 Ken Mood as Council Dogger (as Kenneth Mood)
 Danny Moonshine as Council Dogger
 Mike Rivers as Robb's Boss

References

External links
 
 http://www.sundancechannel.com/films/public-sex/
 http://www.guardian.co.uk/film/2009/dec/17/dogging-a-love-story
 https://www.independent.co.uk/arts-entertainment/films/reviews/dogging-a-love-story-18-1843728.html
 https://www.telegraph.co.uk/culture/film/6839521/Dogging-A-Love-Story-review.html
 http://www.fandango.com/dogging:alovestory_v475909/plotsummary
 The New York Times Movies
 https://www.doggingaction.co.uk/dogging-news/

Films about sexuality
2009 films
British sex comedy films
Vertigo Films films
2000s English-language films
2000s British films